Otter Creek Township is located in LaSalle County, Illinois. As of the 2010 census, its population was 2,970 and it contained 1,247 housing units. Otter Creek was formed from a portion of Bruce Township on an unknown date.

Geography

Demographics

References

External links
US Census
City-data.com
Illinois State Archives

Townships in LaSalle County, Illinois
Townships in Illinois